How to Make Money Like a Porn Star is the first graphic novel published by ReganBooks/HarperCollins, written by New York Times bestselling author Neil Strauss and illustrated by artist Bernard Chang. Strauss and Chang have collaborated on two previous books, How to Make Love Like a Porn Star (the autobiography of porn queen Jenna Jameson), and The Game: Penetrating the Secret Society of Pickup Artists.

The book also features magazine articles, faux ads, and an activity book, and includes additional art contributions from illustrators Sean Chen, John Paul Leon, Gregg Schigiel, and Mark Moretti.

The book has been reprinted in Italy and the Czech Republic. It is banned in Singapore.

Notes

References 
 "A Man Walks Out of a Bar" by Jada Yuan, New York Magazine Book Review, October 16, 2006
 "Strauss, Chang to Create Regan Books Graphic Novel", by Heidi MacDonald, Publishers Weekly, June 5, 2006
 "Chang Tells Us How to Make Money Like a Porn Star" Interview by Jennifer M. Contino, November 7, 2006, The Pulse
 "Neil Strauss Knows "How to Make Money Like a Porn Star" and More Interview by Alex Dueben, July 3, 2007, Comic Book Resources

2006 American novels
American graphic novels
ReganBooks books
Books about pornography